The Mullagh Medal is an award given to the player of the match in the Boxing Day Test match held annually at the Melbourne Cricket Ground in Melbourne, Australia.

In December 2019, Cricket Australia announced plans for a medal to be awarded to the best player of the Boxing Day Test match from 2020, named in honour of Indigenous Australian cricketer Johnny Mullagh. On 29 December 2020, Indian cricketer Ajinkya Rahane became the first recipient of the award.

Recipients

References

Cricket awards and rankings
Awards established in 2020